Barbara Ann Murray (27 September 1929 – 20 May 2014) was an English actress.

Murray was most active in the 1940s and 1950s as a fresh-faced leading lady in many British films such as Passport to Pimlico (1949) and Meet Mr. Lucifer (1953). She continued with film work into the 1960s (including a role in the Tony Hancock film The Punch and Judy Man) but appeared more frequently on television.  She played Mrs Hauksbee in 7 episodes of the TV dramatisations of Rudyard Kipling's Plain Tales from the Hills, from 1964. She is possibly best known for her role as Lady Pamela Wilder in the 1960s drama series The Plane Makers (and the sequel, The Power Game).

Her other TV credits include: The Escape of R.D.7, Danger Man, The Saint, Department S, Strange Report, The Widow of Bath, The Pallisers, based on Anthony Trollope's series of novels (in which she played a major role as Madame Max Goesler, a wealthy foreign widow), The Mackinnons, Doctor Who (in the serial Black Orchid), Albert and Victoria, Robin's Nest 1978 and The Bretts.

In 1976, she spent six weeks in hospital after breaking her jaw, when a car in which she was travelling  was involved in a collision, during a British Council-sponsored acting tour of Brazil: "Fortunately, I was lucky and there were no marks on my face," she reflected.

Murray had three daughters from her marriage to the actor John Justin, but after twelve years of marriage, the couple divorced in 1964. That same year, Murray married Bill "Peter" Holmes, an English literature teacher and former film actor (using the "Peter" first name); this marriage also ended in divorce.

Selected filmography

 Anna Karenina (1948) – Undetermined Role (uncredited)
 Saraband for Dead Lovers (1948) – (uncredited)
 To the Public Danger (1948)
 Badger's Green (1949) – Jane Morton
 Passport to Pimlico (1949) – Shirley Pemberton
 A Boy, a Girl and a Bike (1949) – Minor Role (uncredited)
 Poet's Pub (1949) – Nelly Bly
 Don't Ever Leave Me (1949) – Joan Robbins
 Boys in Brown (1949) – Kitty Hurst
 Tony Draws a Horse (1950) – Joan Parsons
 The Dark Man (1951) – Carol Burns
 Mystery Junction (1951) – Pat Dawn
 Another Man's Poison (1951) – Chris Dale
 The Frightened Man (1952) – Amanda
 Hot Ice (1952) – Mary
 Street Corner (1953) – WPC Lucy Loggart
 Death Goes to School (1953) – Miss Shepherd
 Meet Mr. Lucifer (1953) – Patricia
 The Teckman Mystery (1954) – Kitty
 Doctor at Large (1957) – Kitty
 Campbell's Kingdom (1957) – Jean Lucas
 A Cry from the Streets (1958) – Ann Fairlie
 Operation Bullshine (1959) – Pvt. Betty Brown
 The Punch and Judy Man (1963) – Lady Jane Caterham
 Doctor in Distress (1963) – Iris Marchant – Physiotherapist
 A Hard Day's Night (1964) – Picture in Paul's Daily Express (uncredited)
 A Dandy in Aspic (1968) – Miss Vogler
 Some Will, Some Won't (1970) – Lucille
 Up Pompeii (1971) – Ammonia
 Tales From the Crypt (1972) – Enid Jason (segment 4 "Wish You Were Here")
 The Curse of King Tut's Tomb (1980) – Giovanna Antoniella
 The Power (1984) – Tommy's Mother
 The Harpist (1999) – Mrs. Budde (final film role)

Notes

External links

1929 births
British stage actresses
British film actresses
British television actresses
2014 deaths
20th-century British businesspeople